In Concert/MTV Plugged is a 1992 concert video and 1993 live album by Bruce Springsteen.

It is part of MTV's Unplugged series, recorded on September 22, 1992, at the Warner Hollywood Studios in Los Angeles near the start of Springsteen's tour for Human Touch and Lucky Town. The concert originally aired on MTV on November 11, 1992, with a one-hour Springsteen documentary beforehand.

Springsteen played one song, the previously unreleased "Red Headed Woman", solo on acoustic guitar, then he and his hired band (this was during the time the E Street Band was dissolved, although members Roy Bittan and Patti Scialfa continued to perform with Springsteen) used amplified instruments the rest of the show; hence, the concert was called MTV Plugged (sometimes written XXPlugged after the album cover art).  Reportedly Springsteen had been unhappy with the touring band's rehearsals of acoustic arrangements, and this is what led him to break the Unplugged format. Commercially the album was certified Gold in the US.

Album
The album had a moderate reception. "With E Street ringers focusing on Bruce's 'solo' material...," said Entertainment Weekly, "Well, we won't go there."  The song played on the show were relatively intense renditions, as highlighted by Springsteen's vocals and much of the instrumental accompaniment. The sombre, folk-oriented "Atlantic City" was played in a rock setting, with a rhythm intro on electric guitar as well as Springsteen's solos on the outro. Springsteen played outro solos on most of the rock songs, including "Lucky Town". The album reached number 4 in a seven-week run on the UK chart.

Track listing
All songs written by Bruce Springsteen

 "Red Headed Woman" (previously unreleased) – 2:51
 "Better Days" (from Lucky Town) – 4:27
 "Atlantic City" (from Nebraska) – 5:38
 "Darkness on the Edge of Town" (from Darkness on the Edge of Town) – 4:40
 "Man's Job" (from Human Touch) – 5:43
 "Human Touch" (from Human Touch) – 7:30
 "Lucky Town" (from Lucky Town) – 5:08
 "I Wish I Were Blind" (from Human Touch) – 5:14
 "Thunder Road" (from Born to Run) – 5:28
 "Light of Day" (from the soundtrack to the film Light of Day – originally performed by Joan Jett & Michael J. Fox) – 8:17
 "If I Should Fall Behind" (from Lucky Town) – 4:45
 "Living Proof" (from Lucky Town) – 6:05
 "My Beautiful Reward" (from Lucky Town) – 5:58

Video
A VHS and Laserdisc release of the show preceded any audio release, coming on December 15, 1992, and running 120 minutes.  More songs were present here than on the later audio incarnation and on what actually aired on MTV.

On November 9, 2004, a DVD reissuing of this performance was released.

Selection listing
 "Red Headed Woman"
 "Better Days"
 "Local Hero"
 "Atlantic City"
 "Darkness on the Edge of Town"
 "Man's Job"
 "Growin' Up"
 "Human Touch"
 "Lucky Town"
 "I Wish I Were Blind"
 "Thunder Road"
 "Light of Day"
 "The Big Muddy"
 "57 Channels (And Nothin' On)"
 "My Beautiful Reward"
 "Glory Days"
Bonus songs not included in the MTV show:
 "Living Proof"
 "If I Should Fall Behind"
 "Roll of the Dice" (DVD Only)

Personnel
 Bruce Springsteen – lead vocals, lead and rhythm guitar and harmonica
The Band's Musicians
 Zack Alford (as Zachary Alford)  – drums
 Roy Bittan – keyboards
 Shane Fontayne – lead and rhythm guitar
 Tommy Sims – bass
 Crystal Taliefero – acoustic guitar, percussion and background vocals
 Gia Ciambotti – background vocals
 Carol Dennis – background vocals
 Cleopatra Kennedy – background vocals
 Bobby King – background vocals
 Angel Rogers – background vocals
 Patti Scialfa – acoustic guitar and harmony vocals on "Human Touch"

Charts

Weekly charts

Year-end charts

Certifications and sales

References

Bruce Springsteen video albums
Bruce Springsteen live albums
1993 live albums
MTV Unplugged albums
1992 video albums
1992 live albums
Live video albums
Columbia Records live albums
Columbia Records video albums